Yonatan Stern is an Israeli-American scientist and entrepreneur. He is the founder of multiple high tech software companies including Rosh Intelligent Systems, CardScan, Zoom Information, Bizo Inc, Opster Ltd and AltNext Ltd. Stern sold 3 of his companies for more than a billion dollars. He was awarded the Israel Defense Prize for contributions to the defense of the State of Israel.

Early life 
The Bak family started the first Hebrew printing press in Israel in the modern era. Stern's father fled Czechoslovakia after a pogrom erupted in his town of Pezinok in 1939 and arrived in Mandatory Palestine the same year.

Stern graduated cum laude from the Technion, with a bachelors (1976) and masters (1980) in computer science, working with Professor Shimon Even. He served in the Israeli Army, rising to the rank of Major in the Israeli Intelligence Corps.

Career 
After leaving the army in 1981, Stern went on to co-found his first company - Rosh Intelligent Systems, where he was CEO. The company provided software maintenance and artificial intelligence diagnostic solutions, and was one of the first venture backed companies in Israel. Stern moved to Boston in 1989 to manage the Rosh headquarters there. Rosh (later renamed ServiceSoft) was sold to Broadbase Software in 2002.

Stern left Rosh in 1993 to found Corex Technologies Inc (later renamed to CardScan). He served as its CEO until 2006. The company sold business card scanners, and was, according to the NPD group, the best-selling card scanning solution in the early 2000s.

In 2004, Stern returned to Israel after 15 years with his wife and three daughters, but continued to manage his companies in Boston through frequent travel.

In 2000, he created a new company called Eliyon Technologies. It received investment from Venrock, and later the company changed its name to Zoom Information Inc. ZoomInfo is a go-to-market solution provider, selling business intelligence data on millions of businesses and business contacts. Stern was the founder, CEO and Chief Scientist at ZoomInfo, and has six patents issued in his name. He developed most of the core technology that still runs the company. In 2017 the company was sold to Great Hill Partners, a private equity firm for $240 million dollars, with Stern staying on as CEO until July 2018, and remained on the company's board. Six months after leaving the CEO position, the company was sold to DiscoverOrg for $785 million dollars, who later adopted the ZoomInfo name and brand for the combined company.

In 2008 Stern was a co-founder of Bizo which was a spin-off from ZoomInfo. The company provided business demographic data for online publishers. Bizo was acquired by LinkedIn in 2014 for $175M dollars.

In 2019 Stern co-founded two companies - AltNext and Opster. AltNext is a live-streaming marketing platform for the Esports industry. Opster is an ElasticSearch monitoring and performance enhancement tool set.

Awards & Recognition 
In 1980 Stern was awarded the Israel Defense Prize.

Stern was nominated for the Ernst & Young's Young Entrepreneur of the Year award three times, in 1998, 1999 and 2001.

External links

References 

1954 births
Living people
People from Jerusalem
Technion – Israel Institute of Technology alumni
21st-century Israeli businesspeople
Israel Defense Prize recipients